The Sikorsky H-53 is a family of military helicopters built by Sikorsky Aircraft.

Variants include:

 Sikorsky CH-53 Sea Stallion, a heavy-lift helicopter introduced in 1966 with two engines, a six bladed main rotor and a four bladed tail rotor. Developed as a transport helicopter and an assault helicopter.
 Sikorsky MH-53 Pave Low and Sikorsky HH-53 Super Jolly Green Giant, upgraded helicopters with more powerful engines, improved avionics and armament used for combat search and rescue and special operations.
 Sikorsky CH-53E Super Stallion and Sikorsky MH-53E Sea Dragon, a heavier helicopter introduced in 1981, developed from the CH-53 Sea Stallion by adding a third engine, a seventh blade to the main rotor and canting the tail rotor 20 degrees. The MH-53E Sea Dragon is used for long range mine sweeping or airborne mine countermeasures.
 Sikorsky CH-53K King Stallion, a variant currently being developed with composite rotor blades, a wider cabin, and modernised systems.

 

United States helicopters